Virgilio is a frazione of the  comune (municipality) of Borgo Virgilio in the Province of Mantua in the Italian region Lombardy, located about  southeast of Milan and about  south of Mantua. It was a separate comune until 2014.

People
According to legend, the village of Andes (Pietole Vecchia), a short distance from the center of Pietole in modern Virgilio, is the birthplace of the Roman poet Virgil (70 BCE – 19 BCE).

The comune di Virgilio is cited as "Pietoli patria di Virgilio" in the Gallery of Maps located in the Vatican Museums and painted by Ignazio Danti.

Cities and towns in Lombardy